The Jagham language, Ejagham, also known as Ekoi, is an Ekoid language of Nigeria and Cameroon spoken by the Ekoi people. The E- in Ejagham represents the class prefix for "language", analogous to the Bantu ki- in KiSwahili

The Ekoi are one of several peoples who use Nsibidi ideographs, and may be the ones that created them.

Writing System
A Jagham alphabet was developed by John R. Watters and Kathie Watters in 1981.

Dialects 
Ekoi is dialectally diverse. The dialects of Ejagham are divided into Western and Eastern groups:
 Western varieties include Bendeghe, Northern and Southern Etung, Ekwe and Akamkpa-Ejagham;
 Eastern varieties include Keaka and Obang.

Blench (2019) also lists Ekin as an Ejagham dialect.

Morphology
Ekoi has the following noun classes, listed here with their Bantu equivalents. Watters (1981) says there are fewer than in Bantu because of mergers (class 4 into 3, 7 into 6, etc.), though Blench notes that there is no reason to think that the common ancestral language had as many noun classes as proto-Bantu.

('N' stands for a homorganic nasal. 'j' is "y".)

References

External links
 Ejagham basic lexicon at the Global Lexicostatistical Database

Ekoid languages
Languages of Nigeria
Languages of Cameroon